Hochberg (Chiemgau) is a mountain of Bavaria, Germany.

Mountains of Bavaria
Chiemgau Alps